Taddington is a civil parish in the Derbyshire Dales district of Derbyshire, England.  The parish contains 13 listed buildings that are recorded in the National Heritage List for England.  Of these, one is listed at Grade I, the highest of the three grades, and the others are at Grade II, the lowest grade.  The parish contains the village of Taddington and the surrounding countryside.  Most of the listed buildings are farmhouses and farm buildings, and the others consist of a house, a church, three mileposts, a railway viaduct, and a row of lime kilns.


Key

Buildings

References

Citations

Sources

 

Lists of listed buildings in Derbyshire